Hendrikus Andreas Lambertus "Henk" van Hoof  (born 9 November 1947) is a retired Dutch politician of the People's Party for Freedom and Democracy (VVD) and naval officer.

Van Hoof served in the Royal Netherlands Navy from April 1965 until May 1981 and as a trade union leader for the Royal Association of Navy Officers from May 1981 until November 1991 and served as General-Secretary from July 1990 until November 1991. Van Hoof became a Member of the House of Representatives after Henk Koning was appointed as President of the Court of Audit, taking office on 5 November 1991. After the election of 1998 Van Hoof was appointment as State Secretary for Defence in the Cabinet Kok II, taking office on 3 August 1998. The Cabinet Kok II resigned on 16 April 2002 following the conclusions of the NIOD report into the Srebrenica massacre during the Bosnian War and continuing to serve in a demissionary capacity. After the election of 2002 Van Hoof returned as a Member of the House of Representatives, taking office on 23 May 2002. Following the cabinet formation of 2002 Van Hoof was not giving a cabinet post in the new cabinet and the Cabinet Kok II was replaced by the Cabinet Balkenende I on 22 July 2002. In Augustus 2002 Van Hoof announced that he wouldn't not stand for the election of 2003 and continued to serve until the end of the parliamentary term on 30 January 2003. In August 2003 Van Hoof was appointed as acting Mayor of Delfzijl after acting Mayor Annemarie Jorritsma was nominated as Mayor of Almere, serving from 16 August 2003 until 1 May 2004. Van Hoof was appointment as State Secretary for Social Affairs and Employment in the Cabinet Balkenende II after Mark Rutte was appointment as State Secretary for Education, Culture and Science, taking office on 17 June 2004. The Cabinet Balkenende II fell on 30 June 2006 and continued to serve in a demissionary capacity until it was replaced by the caretaker Cabinet Balkenende III with Van Hoof continuing as State Secretary for Social Affairs and Employment, taking office on 7 July 2006. In August 2006 Van Hoof announced his retirement from national politics and that he wouldn't not stand for the election of 2006. The Cabinet Balkenende III was replaced by the Cabinet Balkenende IV on 22 February 2007.

Van Hoof retired from active politic and became active in the private sector and public sector and occupies numerous seats as a corporate director and nonprofit director on several boards of directors and supervisory boards (Limburg Secondary Education association, Stichting Pensioenfonds Zorg en Welzijn) and as a trade association executive for the Industry and Employers confederation (VNO-NCW).

Decorations

References

External links

Official
  H.A.L. (Henk) van Hoof Parlement & Politiek

 

 

1947 births
Living people
Dutch corporate directors
Dutch lobbyists
Dutch nonprofit directors
Dutch school administrators
Dutch trade association executives
Dutch trade union leaders
Mayors in Groningen (province)
People from Delfzijl
Members of the House of Representatives (Netherlands)
Officers of the Order of Orange-Nassau
People from Maasgouw
People from Nijmegen
People's Party for Freedom and Democracy politicians
State Secretaries for Defence of the Netherlands
State Secretaries for Social Affairs of the Netherlands
Royal Netherlands Naval College alumni
Royal Netherlands Navy officers
20th-century Dutch military personnel
20th-century Dutch politicians
21st-century Dutch businesspeople
21st-century Dutch politicians